Jeff Brown (born November 13, 1970) is an American former professional basketball player. He was West Coast Conference Player of the Year as a senior at Gonzaga University and played four years of professional basketball, including a season in Australia's National Basketball League.

Brown, a 6'9 forward, came to Gonzaga from nearby Mead Senior High School in Spokane, Washington.  He played for the Zags from 1991 to 1994 and was a three-time first team All-West Coast Conference (WCC) pick and the 1994 conference player of the year.  Nationally, Brown was twice named a first team Academic All-American and was selected as the GTE men's basketball Academic All-America Team Member of the Year in 1994.  For his career, Brown scored 1,646 points.

Following his college career, Brown played basketball professionally in Spain, Argentina, Belgium and Australia (Adelaide 36ers).  In 1998, Brown left basketball for a career in the IT industry.  He was inducted into the WCC Hall of Honor in 2010.

References

External links
College stats @ sports-reference.com

1970 births
Living people
Adelaide 36ers players
American expatriate basketball people in Argentina
American expatriate basketball people in Australia
American expatriate basketball people in Belgium
American expatriate basketball people in Spain
American men's basketball players
Basketball players from Spokane, Washington
Gonzaga Bulldogs men's basketball players
Power forwards (basketball)
Washington Huskies men's basketball players